"Twice Upon a Time" is an episode of the British science fiction television series Doctor Who, written by Steven Moffat, directed by Rachel Talalay, and was broadcast as the thirteenth (and to date final) Christmas special on 25 December 2017 on BBC One. It features the final regular appearance of Peter Capaldi as the Twelfth Doctor, the first official appearance of Jodie Whittaker as the Thirteenth Doctor, and guest-stars David Bradley as the First Doctor, having previously portrayed original First Doctor actor William Hartnell in the 2013 docudrama An Adventure in Space and Time. Pearl Mackie guest stars as the Twelfth Doctor's former companion Bill Potts, while his other companions make guest appearances –
Jenna Coleman as Clara Oswald and Matt Lucas as Nardole.

This episode is a continuation of events after "The Doctor Falls", addressing the cliffhanger that it ended on, and takes place during the final serial of the First Doctor, The Tenth Planet (1966), which ended with the introduction of the concept of a Doctor regenerating; footage from The Tenth Planet is used in the special. "Twice Upon a Time" is Capaldi's fourth and final Christmas special as the Twelfth Doctor, and the last Doctor Who story to be written and produced by Moffat, who had served as the show's executive producer and chief writer since taking over from Russell T Davies in 2010. After the special's broadcast, Moffat was succeeded as executive producer and showrunner by Chris Chibnall. It is also the last episode to have music composed by Murray Gold, who had composed music since the series' revival in 2005 and was succeeded by Segun Akinola in Series 11. The special has received generally positive reviews from critics.

Plot

Synopsis 
Wandering back to his TARDIS through the South Pole in 1986 after leaving his companions behind, the First Doctor refuses to regenerate. He encounters the Twelfth Doctor outside his own TARDIS in a similar state of mind. The pair are soon approached by a confused and injured First World War British captain (Mark Gatiss), displaced from December 1914 while in a gun-point stalemate with a German soldier. All three are then forcibly taken into a large spaceship. Inside, they meet with Bill Potts. The Twelfth Doctor, however, doubts she is the real Bill. Upon encountering the ship's glass-like holographic pilot, they are offered freedom in exchange for allowing the ship to return the Captain to the moment of his death. Refusing to allow the Captain to die, they escape and take the First Doctor's TARDIS to the planet Villengard in the far future.

Alone, the Twelfth Doctor meets with the rogue Dalek Rusty, who has taken refuge from other Daleks hunting it. Given access to the Dalek Hivemind, the Doctor learns that the pilot and its ship, known as Testimony, were created on New Earth, designed to extract people from their timelines at the moment of their death, and archive their memories into glass avatars. "Bill" is one such avatar, created from her memories. Seeing no evil to fight, the Doctors agree to return the Captain to his timeline. Upon arrival, the Captain asks the Doctors to keep an eye on his family, introducing himself as Archibald Hamish Lethbridge-Stewart (implying that he is the ancestor of the Doctor's frequent ally and lifelong friend, the Brigadier, and his daughter Kate Stewart). As time resumes, the Doctors watch as soldiers on both sides begin singing "Silent Night". The Twelfth Doctor explains to the First that he deliberately shifted the Captain's timeline forward to the start of the Christmas truce, to ensure his life would be spared.

With the Captain saved, the First Doctor informs the Twelfth that he is now prepared to regenerate and says his goodbyes before returning to his TARDIS. He returns to the South Pole for Ben and Polly and finally regenerates into his second incarnation. Now alone with Bill's avatar, the Twelfth Doctor adamantly contends she is not really Bill, but she argues that memories are what defines a person. Bill's avatar restores the Doctor's memories of Clara Oswald before they are joined by Nardole's avatar. The Doctor, however, refuses to give the avatars testimony of his life. They respect his wish to be alone and leave after he embraces them both. The Doctor then returns to the TARDIS and decides to regenerate, but not before relaying some personal advice to his next incarnation.

After the newly regenerated Thirteenth Doctor examines her own reflection, she is shocked and excited to discover that her new incarnation is a woman. However, the instant she presses a button on the console, the TARDIS suffers multiple system failures due to damage caused by the delayed regeneration. Falling out of the tumbling ship, the Doctor watches in horror as the time rotor and the console room explode, and the TARDIS dematerialises while she plummets towards the Earth below.

Continuity 
"Twice Upon a Time" takes place towards the end of the First Doctor's final serial, The Tenth Planet (first broadcast in October 1966), some of which is shown at the start of the special. During the last episode's final moments, the Doctor leaves his companions Ben and Polly and returns to the TARDIS; they find him collapsed in the console room, where he undergoes his first regeneration. Derek Martinus, the episode's director, reportedly cut a line from the original script which suggested that the Doctor was refusing to give in to the regeneration process. Steven Moffat's 2017 story creates an extended narrative around that part of the story, in which the First Doctor delays his regeneration and encounters his future self — the Twelfth Doctor — in the snowy wasteland.

When Testimony shows the First Doctor images of his future incarnations, clips from both the classic series and the revival are used, including the Third Doctor from Invasion of the Dinosaurs (1974); the Fifth Doctor from Arc of Infinity (1983); the Seventh Doctor from The Happiness Patrol (1988); the Eighth Doctor from "The Night of the Doctor" (2013); the Ninth Doctor from "The Parting of the Ways" (2005); and the Tenth Doctor from "The Waters of Mars" (2009).

Testimony also lists several of the Doctor's future titles: "The Shadow of the Valeyard" (from The Trial of a Time Lord, said to be a distillation of the Doctor's darker side), "the Oncoming Storm" ("The Parting of the Ways"), "the Imp of the Pandorica" (a reference to the Eleventh Doctor story "The Pandorica Opens"), "the Beast of Trenzalore" ("The Time of the Doctor"), "the Butcher of Skull Moon" and "the Doctor of War" ("Hell Bent"). "The Destroyer of Skaro" refers to the destruction of the planet in Remembrance of the Daleks (1988), although Skaro was later restored, as explained in "Asylum of the Daleks" (2012) and shown in "The Magician's Apprentice" (2015).

The Weapons Factories of Villengard were originally mentioned in "The Doctor Dances" (Steven Moffat's first Doctor Who story), where the Ninth Doctor implied that he was responsible for their destruction.

Helen Clay, who would become Testimony's glass pilot, was from New Earth and lectured at "New Earth University," a reference to the Tenth Doctor stories "New Earth" and "Gridlock".

Outside references 
The Doctor addresses his original incarnation as "Mary Berry", "Corporal Jones", and "Mr Pastry". Mr Pastry was a comedic variety stage act and children's show character played by actor Richard Hearne, who was once considered for the role of the Fourth Doctor. Hearne, however, wanted to play the Doctor as a version of Mr. Pastry, so he was passed over in favour of Tom Baker.

The Doctor paraphrases philosopher Bertrand Russell when he advises his future self that "hate is always foolish and love is always wise".

Production

Cast notes 
Peter Capaldi reprised his role as the Twelfth Doctor. On 30 January 2017, he confirmed that the tenth series would be his last, and that he was set to leave after the 2017 Christmas special. The episode also sees the introduction of Jodie Whittaker as the Thirteenth Doctor, whose casting was announced on 16 July 2017.

David Bradley appears in the episode as the First Doctor, having previously portrayed William Hartnell in the docudrama An Adventure in Space and Time. This makes him the third actor to play the role in the television programme, after William Hartnell and Richard Hurndall (in 1983's The Five Doctors) since the premiere of Doctor Who in 1963. Bradley previously played Solomon in the 2012 episode "Dinosaurs on a Spaceship". Since 2017, Bradley has reprised his role as the First Doctor in many audio dramas for Big Finish Productions alongside his co-stars from An Adventure in Space and Time.

The first trailer for the episode was shown during the 2017 San Diego Comic-Con, revealing the return of Polly, a companion from the end of William Hartnell's tenure as the First Doctor, portrayed by Lily Travers, and Pearl Mackie as Bill Potts. Also confirmed were appearances by Toby Whithouse, writer of seven episodes between 2006 and 2017, and Mark Gatiss, also writer of nine episodes between 2005 and 2017, marking his fourth acting appearance in the series, playing a character credited as The Captain. In an interview following the episode's broadcast, Gatiss said he cried at the thought of playing the Brigadier's grandfather when he finished reading the script. However, the Haisman Literary Estate asserted their control of the backstory of the Brigadier, stating that Archibald was actually the Brigadier's great-uncle who appeared in Night of the Intelligence. They later compromised in What's Past is Prologue by implying that Archibald may secretly be the biological father of the Brigadier's father, thereby allowing for either interpretation.

It was later confirmed that Ben Jackson, a companion of the First and Second Doctors, who served alongside Polly, would also feature in the episode and that he would be played by the former Hollyoaks cast member Jared Garfield. Hartnell, Anneke Wills and Michael Craze appeared as the First Doctor, Polly and Ben respectively through archive footage, as also did Patrick Troughton as the freshly regenerated Second Doctor. Nikki Amuka-Bird voices the "Glass Woman".

As with the last change of showrunners, Chibnall wrote the final moments of the episode, so as to allow him to write Whittaker's first lines on the show. This happened in the 2010 special "The End of Time", when Moffat took over for Russell T. Davies in the final moments of the episode, writing Matt Smith's first words as the Eleventh Doctor.

The episode includes a cameo appearance by Jenna Coleman as Clara Oswald, as the Doctor's memories of Clara, lost during "Hell Bent", are restored. The scene was the last to be filmed for the episode and while Coleman was willing to come back to film, timing between the filming of this special and her work in Victoria was difficult to arrange. Moffat said "How many times have I killed that girl off and she was right there in my last shot! It's absolutely extraordinary. The unkillable Coleman!"

Filming 
The episode was written by Steven Moffat and directed by Rachel Talalay, who wrote and directed the two-part finale of the tenth series, "World Enough and Time" / "The Doctor Falls", respectively. In January 2016, Moffat announced that he would step down as the programme's showrunner after the tenth series, to be replaced by Chris Chibnall beginning with the eleventh series in 2018, but a 2017 Christmas special was not mentioned in the plans at that time. The change in showrunners almost caused the annual episode to be cancelled, as Moffat planned to leave after the tenth series finale and Chibnall did not want to begin his run with a Christmas special. When he learned of Chibnall's plans, Moffat elected to stay long enough to produce one final episode, as he was concerned that the show would lose the coveted 25 December slot in the future if it missed a year. As a result, he had to rewrite his plans for the tenth series finale to allow Capaldi to appear in one more episode.

Near the end of the special, the two Doctors part company and return to their respective TARDISes to undergo regeneration. The First Doctor's regeneration is shown, using original footage from "The Tenth Planet". Although the last episode of the 1966 story is one of the missing episodes of Doctor Who, the regeneration sequence was preserved when it was used in a 1973 edition of the children's magazine programme Blue Peter.

The final scene of "The Doctor Falls" involving David Bradley was filmed as part of the filming of "Twice Upon a Time" in June 2017. Production for "Twice Upon a Time" started on 12 June 2017, and concluded on 10 July 2017. However, the final scene of the episode, in which Whittaker makes her debut as the Doctor, was not filmed until 19 July. The episode had been reportedly titled "The Doctors", before it was announced at the 2017 San Diego Comic-Con that it would officially be titled "Twice Upon a Time".

Broadcast and reception 
The episode was watched by 5.70 million viewers overnight, making it the fifth most watched programme of the day across all channels. The episode received 7.92 million views overall, and it received an Appreciation Index of 81. In the United States "Twice Upon a Time" was watched by 2.2 million viewers on BBC America.

Cinemas 
"Twice Upon a Time" was released in cinemas in multiple countries, including Brazil on 25 December, Australia and Denmark on 26 December, and the United States and Canada on 27–28 December. The cinema release includes two bonus features: a behind-the-scenes view of the episode, and a special celebrating the tenure of Peter Capaldi as the Doctor and Steven Moffat as showrunner and lead writer.

Critical reception 

"Twice Upon a Time" received generally positive reviews, with praise given to the performances. 88% of 24 critic reviews are positive on Rotten Tomatoes, with an average rating of 7.55/10. The site's consensus reads "Doctor Who: Twice Upon a Time pays gratifying homage to the outgoing Doctor while marking a thoughtful, warm and funny passing of the torch to a new era in the franchise."

The episode was a finalist in the category of Best Dramatic Presentation, Short Form for the 2018 Hugo Awards. It was also nominated for Saturn Award for Best Television Presentation.

Some commentators have criticised elements of the script such as the depiction of the First Doctor, who is portrayed as displaying a sexist attitude. Moffat said that Hartnell's Doctor was "not progressive. Without being too outrageous I think we have re-created that version of Hartnell's Doctor, with all the 1960s political incorrectness in place. At the same time the original Doctor has a lot of fun at the expense of the modern one's sonic glasses and electric guitar. There's something funny about the 12th Doctor realising that he came from this politically incorrect, funny old man. This is who he was." Den of Geek reported that this was a controversial aspect of the episode even in the pre-publicity: "the casual sexism of the first Doctor weaved unsubtly throughout this story and played for laughs." Patrick Mulkern of Radio Times, despite his praise of the episode, criticised Moffat's characterisation for the First Doctor, believing that viewers "will cavil that his character has been revised, made to seem more old-fashioned than he was."

Michael Hogan offered a negative review for The Daily Telegraph, criticising Moffat's writing and concluding that viewers "would have been left scratching their heads in bafflement. It was self-indulgent, overcomplicated and, most unforgivably, frequently boring."

Commercial releases

Home media 
The episode was released on DVD and Blu-ray in Region 2 on 22 January 2018, in Region 4 on 7 February 2018, and in Region 1 on 13 February 2018.

"Twice Upon a Time" is also the first Doctor Who episode to be released on the Ultra HD Blu-ray format. It was released in North America on 25 September 2018.

In print 
A novelisation of the story, written by Paul Cornell, was released in paperback by BBC Books on 5 April 2018. Also on the same day, a digital edition was released, both as part of the Target Collection.

Notes

References

Bibliography

External links 

 
 
 

2017 British television episodes
British Christmas television episodes
Christmas truce
Doctor Who Christmas specials
Doctor Who multi-Doctor stories
Doctor Who serials novelised by Paul Cornell
Fiction set in 1914
Fiction set in 1986
First Doctor serials
Novels by Paul Cornell
Television episodes written by Steven Moffat
Thirteenth Doctor episodes
Twelfth Doctor episodes
Television episodes about World War I
Television episodes set in the 1980s
Doctor Who regeneration stories